Barcheston is a village and civil parish in the Stratford-on-Avon district of Warwickshire, England. The village is on the east bank of the River Stour, opposite Shipston-on-Stour. It shares a parish council with Willington. The parish, administered at its lowest level by the Barcheston and Willington Parish Meeting, is in the Ettington ward of the district council. According to the 2001 Census the parishes population was 134, increasing to 141 at the 2011 Census.

Ralph Ardern inherited the manor of Barcheston between 1382 (the death of his father, Henry de Ardern) and 1408 (the death of his mother). Whether or not he was ever resident is unknown. The first English tapestry factory was the Sheldon looms, established here in Warwickshire by William Sheldon about the middle of the 16th century. The Sheldon tapestries produced here compare well with the finest contemporary Flemish weavings. Some of these consisted of large tapestry maps of English counties. An outline of Barcheston's history can be found in the Victoria County History, Warwickshire.

See also
 Mortlake Tapestry Works

References

External links
 
 

Villages in Warwickshire
Civil parishes in Warwickshire
Stratford-on-Avon District